Enrichetta Thea Prandi (25 November 1925 – 8 June 1961), known as Thea Prandi, was an Italian actress and singer who was active in the 1940s and 1950s. She is known for her roles in Una famiglia impossibile (1940) and L'allegro fantasma (1941), and as the narrator in Neapolitans in Milan (1953). 

Prandi sang on EIAR radio broadcasts as a member of the "Trio Primavera" with Isa Bellini and Wilma Mangini. After retiring from showbusiness, she worked as an administrator of the Teatro San Ferdinando in Naples.

Personal
She met actor/playwright Eduardo De Filippo in 1947 while being a soubrette in the revue company "Teatro dei Fiorentini", and they were married for three years from 1956 to 1959. Previous to their marriage, they had two children together, the actor Luca De Filippo, and a daughter Luisa "Luisella" De Filippo. Luisella died at the age of 10 from a cerebral hemorrhage in 1960. During their relationship, Prandi served as De Filippo's secretary and also appeared in several of his stage comedies. 

Prandi died on 8 June 1961 at the Ciancarelli clinic in Rome after a long illness.

Filmography
 Una famiglia impossibile (1940) - Nerina Bartolla
 L'allegro fantasma (1941) - Lilli 
 Neapolitans in Milan (1953) - narrator

References

External links 
 

1925 births
1961 deaths
Italian film actresses
20th-century Italian actresses